Mohamed Bassam (born 25 December 1990) is an Egyptian professional footballer. He plays for Ceramica Cleopatra, and was briefly a member of the Egypt national football team. He competed at the 2012 Summer Olympics.

Club career
Bassam played most of his career for Tala'ea El Gaish SC, until he transferred to Ceramica Cleopatra in September 2022.

International career
Bassam was part of the Egyptian youth national teams. He was selected for the Egypt U20 in the 2009 FIFA U-20 World Cup, then for the Egypt U23 in the 2011 African U-23 Championship and 2012 Summer Olympics.

Honours
Club
Tala'ea El Gaish
Egyptian Super Cup: 2020–21
Egypt Cup runner-up: 2019–20

International
'''Egypt U23
Africa U-23 Cup of Nations 3rd place: 2011

References

1990 births
Living people
Footballers from Cairo
Egyptian footballers
Olympic footballers of Egypt
Footballers at the 2012 Summer Olympics
Association football goalkeepers
Tala'ea El Gaish SC players
Ceramica Cleopatra FC players
21st-century Egyptian people